Mbarara United  Football Club  was a Ugandan football club located in Mbarara, Mbarara District in Western Uganda.  The club played in the Ugandan Big League in the 2009–10 season but there is currently no FUFA records that confirm that the club is still operating.

History
Mbarara United were one of the 8 teams that participated in the inaugural season of the National First Division in 1968–69, the league being the forerunner of the Ugandan Super League. The club dropped out after one season at the highest level but have had 6 spells playing in topflight football covering 9 seasons over a 40-year period.

They last played in the Ugandan Super League in the 2008–09 season and were unfortunate to be relegated having finished in 14th position with 35 points. The following season in 2009–10 they joined the Ugandan Big League, FUFA's new second tier league, but made little impact in the Rwenzori Group. Their last result in the league was a 7–1 win against Masaka Municipal Council FC.  The club has not been active in recent seasons.

Mbarara United were financed by club members and the Mbarara Municipal Town Council. As Mbarara is located near the south-western border of the country it is not surprising that naturalised Congolese players often dominated their first team.

Record in the top tiers

References

External links
 Uganda – List of Champions – RSSSF (Hans Schöggl)

Football clubs in Uganda